Jean-Marc Loubier is chief executive officer (CEO) of Escada, an international luxury fashion group, since June 2007. He succeeded Frank Rheinboldt. Jean-Marc Loubier worked at LVMH for 16 years, including 10 years as executive vice president of Louis Vuitton. From 2000-2006 he was CEO of Celine, a Paris-based clothing maker, owned by LVMH.

References

Living people
Year of birth missing (living people)
French chief executives